The Immediate Geographic Region of Curvelo is one of the 10 immediate geographic regions in the Intermediate Geographic Region of Belo Horizonte, one of the 70 immediate geographic regions in the Brazilian state of Minas Gerais and one of the 509 of Brazil, created by the National Institute of Geography and Statistics (IBGE) in 2017.

Municipalities 
It comprises 11 municipalities:

 Augusto de Lima
 Buenópolis 
 Corinto 
 Curvelo     
 Felixlândia
 Inimutaba
 Monjolos
 Morro da Garça
 Presidente Juscelino
 Santo Hipólito
 Três Marias

References 

Geography of Minas Gerais